Dennistoun Vaughan Duigan (16 December 1902 – 17 June 1962) was an Australian athlete. He competed in the men's decathlon at the 1924 Summer Olympics. He was born in Elwood, a suburb of Melbourne, Victoria.

References

External links
 

1902 births
1962 deaths
Athletes (track and field) at the 1924 Summer Olympics
Australian decathletes
Olympic athletes of Australia
Athletes from Melbourne
Olympic decathletes
People from Elwood, Victoria